RVL Aviation is a British specialist charter airline based at East Midlands Airport, United Kingdom, it is part of the RVL Group.

RVL Aviation Limited holds a United Kingdom Civil Aviation Authority Type A Operating Licence, it is permitted to carry passengers, cargo and mail on aircraft with 20 or more seats.

History

The company was formed in 1985 as Atlantic Air Transport and was renamed RVL Aviation in April 2007 when parts of the former Air Atlantique Group became independent businesses.

The company began re-locating its core business from Coventry Airport to East Midlands Airport in autumn 2010, and with the completion of the purpose-built hangar facility in October 2011, it closed its outlying base (Blackpool) at the end of 2011.

As well as ad hoc passenger and cargo charters, the company specialises in aerial survey and surveillance for a variety of clients including operations for the Maritime and Coastguard Agency (MCA). Work for the MCA includes surveillance and search and rescue support and providing aircraft on standby for spraying oil spills with dispersant. Originally using a fleet of piston-engined Douglas DC-3 aircraft, the company utilises a Boeing 737NG for emergency spraying.

In April 2021, RVL announced an expansion of their cargo fleet with the addition of a second Saab 340B Freighter, registered G-RVGB.

In April 2022, news circulated that the S340B would be removed from the fleet. Challenges in the UK/European ad-hoc charter market post-Brexit, and absence of long-term contractual work were sighted as reasons.

Fleet 
RVL Group operate the following aircraft: (correct as of August 2022):

4 x Beech King Air
6 x Reims-Cessna F 406

RVL has also recently operated the following types:
2 X SAAB 340B
2 x Partenavia P.68  (2012-2012)
1 x Britten Norman Islander
1 x Cessna 404

References

External links

Charter airlines of the United Kingdom
Airlines established in 1985
British companies established in 1985
Companies based in Leicestershire
1985 establishments in England